Bexleyheath is a town in south-east London, England, located in the London Borough of Bexley. It had a population of 31,929 as at 2011. It is identified in the London Plan as one of 35 major centres in London. Its wider definition is that of a small post town that takes in other surrounding neighbourhoods, including Barnehurst, much of West Heath and the former hamlet of Upton.

History
For most of its history, Bexley heath was heath land. The Romans build a road through the heath, Watling Street, which connected Londinium (London) to Dubris (Dover). This Roman road still marks the spine of Bexley new town.

Eighteenth and nineteenth centuries
 
In the early 19th century, Bexley heath was a broad rough pasture and scrubland with few buildings. Its windmill stood to the north east, where Erith and Mayplace Roads now meet. In 1766 Sir John Boyd had Danson House built in his enclosed land ("park"). The core of this remains as Danson Park between the southern halves of Bexleyheath and Welling. In 1814 most of the rest of what was Bexley heath, north of Bexley, became enclosed (privatised) with a fund of money given in compensation to trustees for the poor of the parish.

In 1859 architect Philip Webb designed Red House for artist, reforming designer and socialist William Morris on the western edge of the heath, in the hamlet of Upton—before Upton became a suburb. The National Trust acquired the house in 2003. Morris wanted to have a "Palace of Art" in which he and his friends could enjoy producing works of art. The house is of red brick with a steep tiled roof and an emphasis on natural materials. It is in a brick-and-tile style to resemble cumulative generational additions. Its layout and geometrics are non-uniform and it is recognised and protected with highest category (Grade I) listed building status as it is avant-garde to influential Arts and Crafts architecture. Morris lived with wife Jane in the house for five years, during which time their two daughters, Jenny and May, were born. Needing to sell the house in 1865 to economise, Morris vowed never to return to it; he said that to see the house again would be more than he could bear.

Bexleyheath's parish church, Christ Church, dates from 1841; and the ecclesiastical parish from 1866; the building of the current church finished in 1877. Alfred Bean, railway engineer and one-time owner of Danson House, furthered the development of Bexleyheath as a London suburb by championing the Bexleyheath Line in the 1880s to support the growth of estates around Danson Park.

Twentieth century
The clock tower at the centre of the modern shopping area, built in 1912, commemorates the coronation of King George V.

The area was part of the historic county of Kent until the creation of Greater London in 1965, at which point Bexleyheath became the administrative base of the newly established London Borough of Bexley. The town centre shops and road layout were redeveloped in the 1980s and 1990s. The latter decade saw the pedestrianisation of the road adjacent to the shopping centre having built two minor bypass roads, Arnsburg Way and Albion Way.

Town centre 

The vast majority of restaurants and eateries are on Broadway. The south side of the central, pedestrianised section of Broadway hosts Broadway Shopping Centre, a covered example completed in 1984, and a substantial supermarket four years later, as in other urban places including New Towns. A cinema stands to the east facing a medium-sized supermarket.

A renovation in 2008 on "The Mall" gave the centre a more modern interior. The appending of "Bexleyheath Square" took place in the early 2000s, more retail units.

The statue outside the Broadway Centre is "Family Outing" by local artist John Ravera; it was commissioned by Norwich Union and unveiled in 1985.

In May 2009 a major redevelopment scheme was approved by the local council following public consultation. This involved the redevelopment of the Bexley council buildings. The magistrates' court was to move to a new building where the library stands, which would be incorporated into the new development of 300 new homes. The work did not proceed as the shopping centre was sold.

In work commencing 2012, the Borough's Civic Offices were converted from the former main office of The Woolwich, which had been vacant seven years. For the resultant vacant site in June 2018, housebuilder Bellway was approved to build 518 homes, of which 110 affordable. The development will include Bexleyheath's tallest building (13 storeys), public realm improvements and offices/retail.

Given cumulative retail investment, Bexleyheath draws many customers particularly from Erith, Thamesmead, Plumstead and Woolwich which adjoin the River Thames.

Leisure and culture
Bexleyheath has leisure facilities including the Edward Alderton Theatre, Cineworld cinema, hotel, the Central Library, Bexley Local Studies and Archive Centre, five-a-side football centre, bingo hall and ten-pin bowling alley (Ten Pin).

Bexleyheath and Belvedere Hockey Club are based in Welling, but play some home matches at Erith School.

Cultural events include regular concerts by the Sidcup Symphony Orchestra held in the hall of Townley Grammar School. The town's theatre, founded in 1976, produces many amateur productions.

Education

Bexleyheath has eight primary schools and four secondary schools. 

{| class="wikitable sortable unsortable" style=" border:solid 1px #999999; margin:0 0 1em 1em;" 
|+Primary schools
|-
!Name
!Type
!Mix
!Status
!Enrollment
|-
|Barrington 
|Primary
|Mixed
|Academy
|210
|-
|Brampton Primary 
|Primary
|Mixed
|Academy
|420
|-
|Bursted Wood 
|Primary
|Mixed
|Academy
|630
|-
|Crook Log
|Primary
|Mixed
|Community School
|413
|-
|Gravel Hill 
|Primary
|Mixed
|Academy
|420
|-
|Pelham 
|Primary 
|Mixed
|Academy
|420
|-
|St Thomas More RC 
|Primary 
|Mixed
|Voluntary Aided
|420
|-
|Upland
|Primary
|Mixed
|Academy
|420
|}

{| class="wikitable sortable unsortable" style=" border:solid 1px #999999; margin:0 0 1em 1em;" 
|+Secondary schools
|-
!Name
!Type
!Mix
!Status
!Enrollment
|-
|Bexleyheath Academy
|Secondary
|Mixed
|Academy
|1144
|-
|St Catherine's Catholic School for Girls
|Secondary
|Girls
|Voluntary Aided
|1015
|-
|St Columba's Catholic Boys' School
|Secondary
|Boys
|Voluntary Aided
|815
|-
|Townley Grammar School
|Secondary
|Mixed
|Grammar
|1631
|}

Places of worship
 

There are 15 churches in Bexleyheath:

 Bethany Hall, Chapel Road, Bexleyheath
 Bexleyheath Community Church, Lyndhurst Chapel, Lyndhurst Road
 Bexleyheath United Reformed Church, Geddes Place
 Christ Church (Church of England), Broadway
 Bexleyheath Methodist Church, Broadway
 Trinity Baptist Church, Broadway
 St John Vianney Roman Catholic Church, Heathfield Road
 St Peters (Church of England), Pickford Lane
 St Thomas More Roman Catholic Church, Long Lane
 The Salvation Army, Lion Road
 Bexley Christian Life Centre (Pentecostal), Rowan Road
 Pantiles Methodist Church, Hurlingham Road
 Grace Baptist Church, Albion Road
 Christ Apostolic Church, Welling (CAC) Dove House
 Kingdom Hall of Jehovah's Witnesses, Upland Road

Transport

Rail
The station is on the Bexleyheath Line, the middle of three lines connecting London and Dartford. Rail services connect the station to London Victoria via Peckham Rye, London Charing Cross, London Cannon Street, Barnehurst, Gravesend and Dartford.

Buses
Bexleyheath is an important hub for Transport for London bus services. There are services connecting it with Bromley, Crayford, Dartford, Eltham, Erith, Lewisham, North Greenwich, Orpington, Sidcup, Thamesmead, Welling and Woolwich.

Notable residents

Marjory Allen, Lady Allen of Hurtwood (1897-1976), landscape architect and child welfare campaigner
Harry Baker (1990–), footballer, born in Bexleyheath
 Stephanie Brind (1977–), professional squash player, born in Bexleyheath and lived on Chieveley Road
 Jimmy Bullard (1978–), Premiership football player
 Kate Bush (1958–), singer-songwriter, born in Bexleyheath
Hall Caine (1853–1931), author, lived in Aberleigh Lodge, Bexleyheath from 1884 to 1889 next door to Red House. Aberleigh Lodge was demolished in the 1970s.
 David Daniels (1942–), cricketer, born in Bexleyheath
 Bernie Ecclestone (1930–), Formula 1 magnate, grew up in Danson Road
 Frank Farmer (1912–2004), physicist, pioneer in developing medical applications for physics, born in Bexleyheath
 Colin Gill (1892–1940), artist, born in Bexleyheath
 Jake Goodman (1993–), footballer, lives in Bexleyheath
 Sheila Hancock (1933–), actress, lived in Latham Road
 Mary Kingsley  (1862–1900), ethnographer, scientific writer, and explorer, lived as a young woman with her mother and brother in Southwood or Southwark House, Main Road (Crook Log).
 Neal Lawson (1963–), politician and commentator, grew up and went to school in Bexleyheath
 Lenny McLean (1949–98), actor, bouncer, bare-knuckle boxer and 'hardest man in Britain', lived in Bexleyheath in later life
 Jo Malone (1963–), perfumer and businesswoman.
 William Morris (1834–96) lived in Red House for much of his life, when Bexleyheath was mostly countryside 
 Melita Norwood (1912–2005), Cold War Soviet spy
 Kenneth Noye (1947–), gangster and convicted murderer, born on Lavernock Road
 Tom Raworth (1938–2017), poet and visual artist, born in Bexleyheath and grew up in Welling
 Liam Ridgewell (1984–), Portland Timbers footballer, born in Bexleyheath, attended Bexleyheath School
 Delia Smith (1941–), television-chef, grew up in Bexleyheath, attended Bexleyheath School
Eric Stephenson (1914–44), footballer (Leeds United), born in Bexleyheath
 Andy Townsend (1963–), professional footballer, grew up in Bexleyheath, attended Bexleyheath School
 Charles Tupper (1821–1915), Canada's sixth Prime Minister lived his retirement years in Bexleyheath

References and footnotes

External links 

 Bexleyheath website
 Welling
 Bexley Local Studies and Archives

 
Areas of London
Districts of the London Borough of Bexley
Major centres of London